WRJX (1230 AM) was a radio station licensed to serve Jackson, Alabama. The station was owned by Thomas Butts, through licensee Pine City Radio, LLC. It previously aired an adult standards music format.

The station has been assigned the WRJX call letters by the Federal Communications Commission (FCC) since March 4, 2002.

Bennie Hewitt's Capital Assets sold this station, along with WHOD and WBMH, for $500,000 to Jason Kyzer's Kyzer Communications, in March 2017; the sale was consummated on June 8, 2017.

On November 14, 2017, WRJX went silent.

WRJX and sister stations WBMH and WHOD were purchased out of bankruptcy for $200,000 by Thomas Butts' Pine City Radio effective June 22, 2018.

On June 6, 2019, WRJX's license was cancelled by the FCC and the WRJX call sign deleted, due to the station having been silent for more than a year.

References

External links
FCC Station Search Details: DWRJX (Facility ID: 8604)
FCC History Cards for WRJX (covering 1949-1981 as WPBB / WTHG / WHOD)
AM Technical Profile: WRJX Alabama Broadcast Media Page

RJX
Mass media in Clarke County, Alabama
Radio stations established in 1950
1950 establishments in Alabama
Defunct radio stations in the United States
Radio stations disestablished in 2019
2019 disestablishments in Alabama
RJX